The 2021 British Hillclimb Championship presented by Avon Tyres is the 74th running of the series, which began in 1947. In normal circumstances it would have been the 75th, but the 2020 season was cancelled due to the global COVID-19 pandemic.

The 2021 Championship was won by 2019 (and reigning) title holder Wallace Menzies, driving a Gould GR59M with a 3.3-litre V8 engine derived from the Cosworth XD.

Format

According to the Championship regulations, points are awarded according to a driver's positions in each of two Run-Offs held at every event. The Run-Offs are contested by the registered drivers who achieve the twelve best times in the preliminary class runs. The scoring system is as follows:

In addition, an extra point is awarded to any driver whose time is under the outright course record at the start of the event. To clarify, the extra point is awarded if that record is beaten in the second Run-Off even if a new record has been set in the first Run-Off, or in any of the class runs. Assuming the planned 28 rounds are held, a driver's best 22 scores will count towards their total, though this number will be reduced if any rounds are cancelled.

The cancellation of Round 16 at Harewood due to adverse weather conditions reduced the number of rounds to 27 and the number of counting scores to 21 (see Round 15 below).

The Championship is open to drivers of many types of car, including completely unmodified production road vehicles. In practice, however, it is overwhelmingly likely that the Champion will drive a single-seat race car either designed and built specially for hillclimbing or converted from a design suitable for circuit racing.

Name

The terms 'hillclimb' and 'hill climb' are used interchangeably. 'Hillclimb' is used on this page because it is the form chosen by the Championship organisers, who also refer to the BHC (British Hillclimb Championship) rather than BHCC (British Hill Climb Championship).

Calendar changes

The Championship was originally scheduled to start at Prescott on April 24/25. The meeting went ahead as planned, but not as a Championship round, "following concerns over some competitors likely to experience travel difficulties due to COVID restrictions within their home countries". The Championship therefore started three weeks later than intended, at Loton Park on May 15/16. The rounds at Craigantlet, originally to be held on May 1, were postponed to September 11, "to avoid any uncertainty surrounding potential travel restrictions due to the current pandemic".

On February 19, the Championship organisers announced that the rounds due to be held in July at the Channel Islands venues, Bouley Bay and Val des Terres, had been abandoned completely after consultation with the organising clubs, "due to the uncertainties regarding travel restrictions throughout the summer".

Event results

Round 1, Loton Park, May 16
Organiser: Hagley & District Light Car Club

Track/weather conditions: mixed

Sean Gould, considered a Championship contender, did not qualify for this Run-Off due to failing to complete his class run.

Wallace Menzies scored his 39th BHC Run-Off win in this round.

This event was livestreamed on YouTube. Footage of the first Run-Off starts at 4:09:00.

Round 2, Loton Park, May 16
Organiser: Hagley & District Light Car Club

Track/weather conditions: mixed

Wallace Menzies scored his 40th BHC Run-Off win in this round.

This event was livestreamed on YouTube. Footage of the second Run-Off starts at 8:48:35.

Round 3, Gurston Down, May 29
Organiser: BARC South West Centre

Track/weather conditions: warm and dry

Wallace Menzies scored his 41st BHC Run-Off win in this round.

Trevor Willis set a new Championship record by qualifying for his 549th Run-Off in this round.

This event was livestreamed on YouTube. Footage of the first Run-Off starts at 2:07:00.

Round 4, Gurston Down, May 29
Organiser: BARC South West Centre

Track/weather conditions: dry, becoming cloudy

Will Hall scored his 25th BHC Run-Off win in this round.

This event was livestreamed on YouTube. Footage of the second Run-Off starts at 4:20:00.

Round 5, Gurston Down, May 30
Organiser: BARC South West Centre

Track/weather conditions: warm and dry

R = new outright course record

Wallace Menzies scored his 42nd BHC Run-Off win in this round.

This event was livestreamed on YouTube. Footage of the first Run-Off starts at 1:46:00. An interview with Wallace Menzies, celebrating his new course record, starts at 2:42:15.

Round 6, Gurston Down, May 30
Organiser: BARC South West Centre

Track/weather conditions: warm and dry

Wallace Menzies scored his 43rd BHC Run-Off win in this round.

Will Hall left the course near the top of the hill, causing a long delay while the car was recovered.

Adam Greenen's Empire Evo 2 coasted to a halt during its run.

Scott Moran, who is sharing Graham Wynn's Gould GR59 this season, was unable to start the car's engine immediately before the second class run. This could not be fixed during the meeting, so Moran was unable to qualify for the second Run-Off. Wynn did qualify, but was unable to take part due to the starting issue.

Simon Moyse achieved his best BHC Run-Off result to date in this round.

This event was livestreamed on YouTube. Scott Moran's starting problem is shown at 3:17:00. Footage of the second Run-Off starts at 3:43:00. Adam Greenen's retirement can be seen at 3:48:00. The livestream was temporarily halted to avoid showing Will Hall's accident, but messages explaining that he was OK were displayed.

Round 7, Shelsley Walsh, June 6
Organiser: Midland Automobile Club

Track/weather conditions: cloudy, drying

Alex Summers scored his 16th BHC Run-Off win in this round.

This event was livestreamed on YouTube. Footage of the first Run-Off starts at 2:56:00.

Round 8, Shelsley Walsh, June 6
Organiser: Midland Automobile Club

Track/weather conditions: cloudy, dry

Alex Summers scored his 17th BHC Run-Off win in this round.

This event was livestreamed on YouTube. Footage of the second Run-Off starts at 8:03:00.

Round 9, Doune, June 19
Organiser: Lothian Car Club

Track/weather conditions: warm, dry

Alex Summers scored his 18th BHC Run-Off win in this round.

Stuart Sugden qualified for a BHC Run-Off for the first time in this round.

This event was not livestreamed.

Round 10, Doune, June 19
Organiser: Lothian Car Club

Track/weather conditions: warm, dry

Sean Gould scored his 10th BHC Run-Off win in this round.

This event was not livestreamed.

Round 11, Doune, June 20
Organiser: Lothian Car Club

Track/weather conditions: cloudy, dry

Wallace Menzies scored his 44th BHC Run-Off win in this round.

Alex Summers broke the existing course record of 34.76 seconds set on 22 June 2014 by Scott Moran. Wallace Menzies lowered it further a few minutes later. Both drivers scored an extra BHC point for being under the record as it stood at the start of the meeting.

This event was not livestreamed.

Round 12, Doune, June 20
Organiser: Lothian Car Club

Track/weather conditions: cloudy, dry

Sean Gould scored his 11th BHC Run-Off win in this round.

Sean Gould broke the existing course record of 34.73 seconds set earlier in the day by Wallace Menzies, and scored an extra BHC point for being under Scott Moran's record which stood at the start of the meeting. All three of the drivers who won rounds at Doune over the weekend (Gould, Menzies and Summers) therefore held the record at some stage.

Alex Summers equalled Moran's record, but did not score an extra BHC point for doing so.

This event was not livestreamed.

Round 13, Barbon, July 3
Organiser: Liverpool Motor Club

Track/weather conditions: dry

Wallace Menzies scored his 45th BHC Run-Off win in this round.

This event was not livestreamed.

Round 14, Barbon, July 3
Organiser: Liverpool Motor Club

Track/weather conditions: dry

Alex Summers scored his 19th BHC Run-Off win in this round.

This event was not livestreamed.

Round 15, Harewood, July 4
Organiser: British Automobile Racing Club North West Centre

Track/weather conditions: drying

Wallace Menzies scored his 46th BHC Run-Off win in this round.

A shower of rain during the class runs created several anomalies in the list of qualifiers for the Run-Off. Notably, Andy Greenen, whose class run took place while the track was still dry, was the fastest qualifier in his 1100cc Suzuki Hayabusa-engined Empire Evo 2, a car with too little power to be considered a front-runner in normal circumstances. Damien Bradley qualified in his Subaru Legacy, becoming the first driver to do so in a road-based car in the 2021 season. Greenen went on to achieve his best BHC Run-Off result to date in this round.

The track conditions were better when the Run-Off started, and continued to improve. Menzies, running eighth out of 12, came within 0.18 seconds of the outright course record, which he had set on 7 July 2019. His winning margin of 2.5 seconds over Alex Summers was extraordinary in an era when Run-Offs may be decided by as little as 0.01 seconds (see Round 11 above), but it was much less than the 6.83-second margin of victory achieved by Tony Marsh at Prescott in 1961.

Jack Cottrill qualified for his first Run-Off of the season and was fifth fastest to the final timing split point but spun coming out of the final corner. There was no damage to car or driver, but Cottrill lost approximately 22 seconds and dropped to 12th position.

The rain returned shortly afterwards, and became so heavy that the organisers had to cancel the rest of the meeting due to the adverse conditions. The number of rounds was therefore reduced to 27, and the number of counting scores to 21 (see Format section above).

This event was livestreamed on YouTube. Footage of the Run-Off starts at 3:56:00. The latter part of Andy Greenen's qualifying run can be seen at 2:36:00. Jack Cottrill's run (and spin) can be seen from 4:03:38. Notice of the meeting's abandonment is shown at 5:30:28.

Round 16, Harewood, July 4
Organiser: British Automobile Racing Club North West Centre

Event cancelled (see Round 15).

Round 17, Prescott, July 25
Organiser: Bugatti Owners' Club

Track/weather conditions: warm, dry

Wallace Menzies scored his 47th BHC Run-Off win in this round.

Zachary Zammitt and Charles Hall, sharing the same car, both scored their first BHC points in this round.

Eynon Price and David Warburton became the first drivers to set the same time in a Run-Off during the 2021 season.

Paul Haimes was sixth fastest up to the entry of Pardon hairpin, but half-spun on his way into the corner, lost time and finished 12th.

This event was livestreamed on YouTube. Footage of the first Run-Off starts at 2:44:00. Paul Haimes's spin can be seen at 2:55:20.

Round 18, Prescott, July 25
Organiser: Bugatti Owners' Club

Track/weather conditions: warm, dry

Wallace Menzies scored his 48th BHC Run-Off win in this round.

This event was livestreamed on YouTube. Footage of the first Run-Off starts at 6:09:50. Interviews with leading drivers Sean Gould, Richard Spedding, Wallace Menzies and Alex Summers, and with classic Allard driver Chris Pring, begin at 3:37:50.

Round 19, Wiscombe Park, August 1
Organiser: Woolbridge Motor Club

Track/weather conditions: drying at first after early rain, then heavy rain

Wallace Menzies scored his 49th BHC Run-Off win in this round. Jason Tunnicliffe qualified for his first ever Run-Off. Matthew Ryder scored his first points of the 2021 season. Darren Gumbley qualified for his first Run-Off of the 2021 season.

The class runs took place on a damp track, which slightly favoured the less powerful cars registered for the BHC. Paul Haimes qualified fastest, while Championship contenders Alex Summers and Trevor Willis failed to qualify, for the first time in 2021 in Summers's case.

The situation was reversed during the Run-Off itself. At first, the track was drier than before. However, Richard Spedding crashed on his run, causing no injury to himself but significantly damaging his car. During the clear-up, it began to rain heavily. The lower-powered cars which had been among the fastest qualifiers (and therefore ran late in the Run-Off) therefore had to run on a wet track, and were slower than they would have been in better conditions.

This event was livestreamed on Facebook. Footage of the first Run-Off starts at 2:09:00. Richard Spedding's accident is shown at 2:25:50. Interviews with Trevor Willis, Wallace Menzies, Alex Summers, Graham Wynn, Olivia Cooper, Richard Spedding and Scott Moran (all recorded the previous day) begin at 3:04:20.

Round 20, Wiscombe Park, August 1
Organiser: Woolbridge Motor Club

Track/weather conditions: damp

Wallace Menzies scored his 50th BHC Run-Off win in this round. Kelvin Broad qualified for his first Run-Off of the 2021 season.

This event was livestreamed on Facebook. Footage of the second Run-Off starts at 5:57:00.

Round 21, Shelsley Walsh, August 15
Organiser: Midland Automobile Club

Track/weather conditions: dry

Sean Gould scored his 12th BHC Run-Off win in this round.

Gould, Alex Summers and Wallace Menzies were all under the long-standing outright course record of 22.58 seconds set by Martin Groves on 17 August 2008. Scott Moran and David Uren were both within a tenth of a second of the old record.

This event was not livestreamed.

Round 22, Shelsley Walsh, August 15
Organiser: Midland Automobile Club

Track/weather conditions: dry

Scott Moran extended his record number of Run-Off wins to 162. Nicola Menzies scored her first BHC points of the 2021 season.

This event was not livestreamed.

Round 23, Prescott, September 5
Organiser: Bugatti Owners' Club

Track/weather conditions: warm, dry

Alex Summers scored his 22nd BHC Run-Off win in this round.

This event was livestreamed on YouTube. Footage of the first Run-Off starts at 2:28:10.

Round 24, Prescott, September 5
Organiser: Bugatti Owners' Club

Track/weather conditions: warm, dry

Wallace Menzies scored his 51st BHC Run-Off win in this round.

Menzies set a new outright course record of 35.12 seconds on his second class runs, and lowered it further to 34.65 seconds in this Run-Off. Alex Summers did not hold the record at any stage, but he scored an extra BHC point for being under Sean Gould's record of 35.41 seconds, which stood at the start of the meeting.

Will Hall scored BHC points in his first event following the complete rebuild of his car, which had been very badly damaged in an accident earlier in the season at Gurston Down (see Round 6).

Trevor Willis qualified for this Run-Off but did not complete the course due to an otherwise harmless spin at Pardon hairpin.

This event was livestreamed on YouTube. Footage of the first Run-Off starts at 6:46:10. Trevor Willis's spin is shown at 6:58:30. Wallace Menzies's record run begins at 7:03:20.

Round 25, Craigantlet, September 11
Organiser: Ulster Automobile Club

Track/weather conditions: dry

Wallace Menzies scored his 52nd BHC Run-Off win in this round and in doing so scored enough points to retain his Championship title.

This event was not livestreamed.

Round 26, Craigantlet, September 11
Organiser: Ulster Automobile Club

Track/weather conditions: dry

Wallace Menzies scored his 53rd BHC Run-Off win in this round.

This event was not livestreamed.

Round 27, Loton Park, September 26
Organiser: Hagley and District Light Car Club

Track/weather conditions: dry, windy

Wallace Menzies scored his 54th BHC Run-Off win in this round. Menzies, Alex Summers, Scott Moran, Sean Gould and Trevor Willis were all under the course record of 43.18 seconds set by Gould in June 2021 and were each awarded an extra Championship point for that reason.

This event was livestreamed on YouTube. Footage of the first Run-Off starts at 3:03:40. Interviews with Scott Moran, Alex Summers and Wallace Menzies start at 3:31:00.

Round 28, Loton Park, September 26
Organiser: Hagley and District Light Car Club

Track/weather conditions: dry, windy

Wallace Menzies scored his 55th BHC Run-Off win in this round. No driver beat the course record set during the first Run-Off, but Menzies, Alex Summers, Scott Moran, Trevor Willis and Sean Gould each scored an extra Championship point for being under the record as it stood at the start of the meeting.

This event was livestreamed on YouTube. Footage of the second Run-Off starts at 7:11:20.

Championship standings

Bold text denotes that a score includes an extra point for being under the outright course record as it stood at the start of the meeting.
Italic text on a dark background indicates a dropped score (applicable when the driver has scored points in more than the maximum number of counting rounds).
Scores supplied by the Championship organisers.
- = driver did not qualify the Run-Off.
0 = driver qualified for the Run-Off but did not score points.
This table includes only those drivers who have scored points in at least one Run-Off.

BHC Cup

The Motorsport UK British Hillclimb Championship Cup presented by Footman James (formerly the British Hillclimb Leaders Championship), informally referred to as the BHC Cup, allows drivers with very different types of car to compete on equal terms. Points are awarded according to a driver's positions in each of the two class runs held at every event. Drivers who are not registered for the BHC Cup do not score points, but they can affect the scores of those who are registered. For example, the fastest registered driver in a class will score points for second place if beaten by a non-registered driver.

The scoring system is based initially on the assumption that there are six or more starters in the class, but is adjusted if there are five or fewer, as follows:

In addition, an extra point is awarded to any driver whose time is under the class record at the start of the event. To clarify, the extra point is awarded if that record is beaten in the second class run even if a new record has been set in the first class run.

All BHC Cup rounds are held at British Hillclimb Championship meetings, but only those which take place on the British mainland. No BHC Cup rounds are held on the Channel Islands hills of Bouley Bay and Val des Terres (where the relevant events were in any case cancelled for the 2021 season - see 'Calendar changes' above) or at Craigantlet in Northern Ireland.

Assuming the planned 26 rounds are held, a driver's best 16 scores will count towards their total, though this number will be reduced if any rounds are cancelled.

Wallace Menzies completed the unusual double of winning both the BHC and the BHC Cup in the same season. Second place went to Tom Weaver, who began competing at the age of 16 in March 2019.

Bold text denotes that a score includes an extra point for being under the class record as it stood at the start of the meeting.
Italic text on a dark background indicates a dropped score (applicable when the driver has scored points in more than the maximum number of counting rounds).
- = driver did not take part in the round.
0 = driver took part in the round but did not score points.
Only the top 21 of the 83 points scorers are shown.
Scores supplied by the Championship organisers.

References

Hillclimbing series
Hillclimb Championship